The N-Gage is a smartphone combining features of a mobile phone and a handheld game system developed by Nokia, announced on 4 November 2002 and released on 7 October 2003. It runs the original Series 60 platform on Symbian OS v6.1.

N-Gage attempted to lure gamers away from the Game Boy Advance by including telephone functionality. This was unsuccessful, partly because the buttons, designed for a telephone, were not well-suited for gaming. The original N-Gage was described as resembling a taco, which led to its mocking nickname "taco phone".

Nokia introduced the N-Gage QD in 2004 as a redesign of the original "Classic" N-Gage, fixing widely criticized issues and design problems. However, the new model was unable to make an impact, and with only 2 million units sold in its two years, the N-Gage and its QD model were a commercial failure, unable to challenge their Nintendo rival.

The N-Gage was discontinued in February 2006, with Nokia moving its gaming capabilities onto selected Series 60 smartphones. This was announced as the N-Gage platform or "N-Gage 2.0" in 2007, carrying on the N-Gage name.

Design 

The N-Gage is used in a wide physical form with a 2.1 inch TFT display in the centre with a D-pad to the left and numerical keys to the right, among other buttons. This kind of design was roughly used before by the Nokia 5510 mobile phone.

Instead of using cables, multiplayer gaming was accomplished with Bluetooth or the Internet (via the N-Gage Arena service). The N-Gage also included MP3 and Real Audio/Video playback and PDA-like features into the system.

Besides its gaming capabilities, the N-Gage was a Series 60 smartphone, running Symbian OS 6.1, with features similar to those of the Nokia 3650 (it does not have an integrated camera, however). It was able to run all Series 60 software (other than those that require a camera), and Java MIDP applications as well. Its main CPU was an ARM Integrated (ARMI) compatible chip (ARM4T architecture) running at 104 MHz, the same as the Nokia 7650 and 3650 phones.

Development 
Around 2000, gamers increasingly carried both mobile phones and handheld game consoles. Nokia spotted an opportunity to combine these devices into one unit. Nokia announced in November 2002 that they would develop the N-Gage, a device that integrated these two devices. Its original development codename was Starship.

Many of the preloaded ringtones and sounds were composed by former demoscene musician Markus Castrén, who worked at Nokia during mid-2002. For both the N-Gage and Nokia 7600, he wrote ringtones in a variety of popular dance genres, as well as creating a small set of sounds inspired by 1980s arcade games; he chose to compose those in a chiptune style as music in video games of the time did not stand out as sounding distinctively game-related.

Release 
With a launch price of US$299, the N-Gage was not commercially popular. In its first weeks of availability in the United States, it was outsold by the Game Boy Advance 100 to 1. Within 17 days of the deck's release, popular retailers GameStop and Electronics Boutique began offering $100 rebates on the deck's price.

In February 2004, with the N-Gage failing to make a major impact four months on, CEO Jorma Ollila claimed that the device would be given until 2005 to be judged whether it was a success or failure.

In January 2005, UK sales-tracking firm ChartTrack dropped the N-Gage from its regular ELSPA chart, commenting that "The N-Gage chart, though still produced, is of little interest to anyone. Sales of the machine and its software have failed to make any impact on the market at all." Although only directly reflective of the UK market, this was interpreted by some as a serious blow to the N-Gage as a viable gaming platform. Despite this, Nokia reaffirmed their commitment to the N-Gage as a platform, to the point where a new version of the hardware was rumored after GDC 2005.

In November 2005, Nokia admitted that the N-Gage failed, selling only one-third of the company's expectations. The product was discontinued from Western markets in February 2006, but would continue to be marketed in India and parts of Asia. Nokia did continue N-Gage promotions at E3 2006. The last game to be released in the U.S. for the system was Civilization in March 2006 according to Metacritic. In October 2006, Nokia released the last game for the N-Gage QD, combat racer Payload.

As of August 2007, it was estimated that Nokia had shipped more than two million N-Gage game decks. The "N-Gage" brand name still had a poor reputation within the gaming media and among the few consumers who recognized the N-Gage brand, due to the weakness of the system's first games and the original model's limitations. Nokia had more than 50 games available for the system.

Sales 
There is some disagreement in sources about the actual number of N-Gage decks sold. Nokia initially claimed 400,000 sales in the first two weeks the deck was available. However, independent market research firms Chart-Track and Arcadia Research claimed that the N-Gage had sold only 5,000 decks in the United States in that time, and 800 decks in the UK. Critics suggested Nokia was counting the number of decks shipped to retailers, not the number actually purchased by consumers. Nokia later admitted this was the truth.

In 2004, Nokia claimed in a press release that it had shipped its millionth deck, represented as a company milestone despite falling short of the company's initial projection of six million decks by the end of 2004. However, this number shipped does not give a reliable picture of the actual sales of the deck. Nokia ultimately shipped 3 million N-Gage decks by 2007.

Reception 
Pocket Kingdom: Own the World received a handful of glowing reviews when it was released, and Pathway to Glory was Nokia's first self-published success. These games came perhaps too late to have much effect in improving the perception of the N-Gage hardware itself in the eyes of consumers or press. Nokia had projections of at least 6 million sold decks in three years instead of only 3 million.

Devices

N-Gage Classic 
The original phone's design was considered awkward: to insert a game, users had to remove the phone's plastic cover and remove the battery as the game slot was next to it. Another feature was that the speaker and microphone were located on the side edge of the phone; this often resulted in many describing it as talking into a "taco phone" or "Sidetalking", or simply that they had one very large ear, because the user held the edge of the phone against the cheek in order to talk into it. Usual for a phone, but unusually for a game system, it had a screen taller than it was wide, with a size of 2.1" and resolution of 176 X 208, giving an aspect ratio of 11:13; at the time most televisions and portable game screens were 4:3.

N-Gage QD

N-Gage service 

The new N-Gage, also referred to as N-Gage Next Gen or N-Gage 2.0, saw a change in concept as Nokia explained to the world during E3 2005 that they were planning on putting N-Gage inside several of their smartphone devices, rather than releasing a specific device. In August 2007, the new N-Gage platform was finalised and was released in April 2008. It was compatible on many Symbian S60 smartphones. The service was discontinued in October 2009.

Software 

Before the launch of Nokia's first in-house N-Gage title, Pathway to Glory, a one level demo of the game was released to journalists to allow them to sample the game, and understand the concepts behind the turn based wargame. This demo was subsequently placed on the N-Gage.com website as a free download. Undaunted by the 16 MB download size, fans jumped on the Pathway to Glory demo. The success of the download paved the route for future titles. On June 6, 2006 Nokia announced that people also could buy the games digitally

There are 58 full titles available for N-Gage, but only 56 of these saw North American releases. The titles that were not released in North America are: Flo-Boarding (Germany and UK only) and Sega Rally (Australia and Brazil only). All but three of these titles (Payload, Snakes, Virtua Cop) were available for retail purchase. These are:

Along with those listed above, one more game was bundled with the N-Gage (on the Support CD): an exclusive version of Space Impact Evolution X, that was later made available to Symbian S60v2 phones.

See also 
Danger Hiptop
Mylo (Sony)
Nokia 3300
Ogo (handheld device)
Scalable Network Application Package
Xperia Play

References

External links 

 Nokia's official N-Gage site
 

ARM-based video game consoles
Handheld game consoles
Nokia mobile phones
Products introduced in 2003
Products and services discontinued in 2006
Sixth-generation video game consoles
Smartphones
Symbian devices